Boron is an Indian Bengali language romantic drama television series that premiered on 5 April 2021 at Bengali General Entertainment Channel Star Jalsha and it also available on the digital platform Disney+ Hotstar. The show is produced by Snehasish Chakraborty of Blues Productions and stars Indrani Paul and Sushmit Mukherjee in lead roles.

Plot

Boron narrates the story of a courageous girl who is a hardworking student named Tithi. She wants to be independent and take care of her mom who sacrificed everything for her. Tithi is preparing for an exam and wants to bag a government job.

On the other hand, a rogue and spoilt brat named Rudrik Banerjee, son of a famous industrialist Nandan Banerjee, lives a lavish life and doesn't stick to the rule always. One day, his car hits a pedestrian leaving him critically injured. Tithi witnesses the incident and decides to report it. Tithi is indomitable and doesn't bow down to Rudrik's influential status. She decides to bring justice to the aggrieved people instead.

Tithi testifies against Rudrik in the court on the day of her marriage. Swearing revenge, Rudrik breaks into Tithi's marriage and shoots the groom Raj in his leg. However he ends up marrying Tithi accidentally. Nandan decides to welcome Tithi in the Banerjee household with all due respect, despite objections of his wife and other family members. He convinces them with the help of Naira that this is just an act to remove all negative publicity from their family name. Tithi too agrees on this to save her ailing mother from any further shock.

Slowly on Nandan's request, Tithi teaches Rudrik how to be happy and generous and not to be arrogant. However, sparks fly as Rudrik falls for Tithi, but is unable to confess his feelings to her. On the day of Rudrik's marriage with Naira, Rudrik puts vermilion on Tithi's forehead realising his love for her, whereas Naira marries the wedding priest Purna Chandra "Panu" Bachaspati himself to save her from humiliation.

Cast

Main 
 Indrani Paul as Tithi Banerjee (née Mukherjee) – Parineeta and Raghav's daughter; Prodosh's half-sister; Rudrik's wife.
 Sushmit Mukherjee as Rudrik Banerjee – Nandan and Pritha's son; Sonnrita and Rimjhim's brother; Tithi's husband.

Recurring 
 Priya Mondal as Naira Sen Chatterjee – Jeet's sister; Rudrik's childhood friend and one-sided lover; Prodosh's wife
 Soumodip Singha Roy as Prodosh "Panu" Chatterjee – A priest; Aparajita and Raghav's son; Tithi's half-brother; Naira's husband
 Kushal Chakraborty as Nandan Banarjee – A famous industrialist; Pritha's husband; Sonnrita, Rimjhim and Rudrik's father
 Sutapa Banerjee as Pritha Banerjee – Nandan's wife; Sonnrita, Rimjhim and Rudrik's mother
 Rimjhim Das as Rimjhim Banerjee – Nandan and Pritha's younger daughter; Sonnrita and Rudrik's sister
 Suchanda Chowdhury as Mrs. Banerjee – Nandan's mother; Sonnrita, Rimjhim and Rudrik's grandmother
 Ananya Biswas as Sonnrita Banerjee – A businesswoman; Nandan and Pritha's elder daughter; Rimjhim and Rudrik's sister; Alankar's wife
 Suvankar Saha as Alankar – Sonnrita's husband
 Debjani Chatterjee as Parineeta Mukherjee – Raghav's ex-wife; Tithi's mother
 Sohan Bandyopadhyay as Raghav Mukherjee – Parineeta's ex-husband; Aparajita's husband; Prodosh and Tithi's father
 Dolon Roy as Aparajita Chatterjee – Raghav's second wife; Prodosh's mother
 Basanti Chatterjee as Mrs. Mukherjee – Raghav's mother; Prodosh and Tithi's grandmother
 Sankar Sanku Chakraborty as Tithi's uncle
 Raja Kundu as Raj – Tithi's lover and ex-fiancé
 Rana Mitra as Mandar Banerjee – Rudrik's uncle
 Jayanta Dutta Burman as Shouptik Banerjee – Rudrik's uncle; Diti's husband
 Reshmi Bhattacharya as Diti Banerjee – Shouptik's wife
 Sudipa Basu as Tithi's elder paternal aunt
 Sayantani Majumdar as Aalta Mukherjee – Tithi's aunt
 Riya Ganguly Chakraborty as Keka Banerjee- Rudrik's sister-in-law
 Priyanka Mukherjee as Kakoli Banerjee- Rudrik's younger cousin sister
 Minashree Sarkar as Kuheli Banerjee - Rudrik's younger cousin sister
 Rupsha Chatterjee as Rupsha Banerjee- Rudrik's cousin sister
 Judhajit Banerjee as Jeet Sen- a businessman; Naira's elder brother
 Sahamita Acharya as Preksha- Tithi's younger cousin sister

References

External links 
 Boron at Hotstar

Bengali-language television programming in India
2021 Indian television series debuts
2022 Indian television series endings
Star Jalsha original programming
Indian drama television series